The Atle-Tiba, also known as Atletiba or Athletiba, is one of the most traditional derbies in Brazilian football. It is the match between the two biggest football clubs of Paraná: Coritiba and Athletico Paranaense. The teams founded in 1909 and 1924 respectively and have been each other's rival for many decades. On many occasions the championship of Campeonato Paranaense, the state competition of Paraná, was decided by an Atle-Tiba.

History

Background
The Brazilian city of Curitiba, capital of the state Paraná in the south of Brazil, has always been divided in two halves when it comes to football. The traditional families that had lived in Curitiba for generations rooted for América and Internacional, whereas the new immigrants (mainly the Germans) were represented by Coritiba. It stayed like that, until the traditional families were united when América and Internacional merged to become "Atlético Paranaense" in 1924.

For the fans of Athletico, the opposite fans were 'coxas brancas' – white thighs – because of the skin color of most of Coritiba's fans and players. Athleticanos got the nickname 'almofadinhas', which means something like 'rich people' with a negative sense. Traditionally the Atle-Tiba is the battle between the new immigrants (Coritiba) and the older colonists (Atlético), and of the poor against the rich. Nowadays club loyalty is no longer aligned with these cleavages though.

Matches
The first official game between Coxa and o Furacão took place on June 8, 1924. On the field of Coritiba, Parque Graciosa, the new immigrants won 6–3. It took until December 25, 1927, for Athletico to win its first Atle-Tiba in Água Verde where Coritiba was beaten 2–1. Then it was Coritiba's turn to wait 3 years for a victory. In 1930 Coritiba broke the spell and won 7–3.

The largest victory of Athletico  against Coritiba took place on April 6, 1938. In the Estádio Joaquim Américo, Athletico beat its archrival 6–2. Coritiba's largest victory is not the earlier mentioned 7–3, but a 6–0 victory on November 14, 1959. The highest scoring games is a 7–4 victory for Coritiba as well as a 6–5 Athletico victory.

In the Campeonato Paranaense, the state competition, Coritiba holds the record with 38 titles, followed by Athletico, with 26 titles. They have played against each other in the final of the tournament nineteen times, with Athletico having the slight advantage in winning eight of those matches, Athletico won 10 times while Coritiba won 9 times.

Statistics:

Topscorers

Titles comparison

Note (1): Seletiva para a Libertadores is not considered a title, as the criterion for participation in it was the elimination of clubs in the Brazilian Championship, that is, it "rewarded failure" of participants in another competition.

Note (2): The "Torneio do Povo" in 1973 had an official character but this was the only edition with an official character, the other editions of the tournament had no official character.

See also
 Brazilian Football State Championship
 Campeonato Paranaense

References

External links
History of the Atle-Tiba - Portuguese
Curiosities of the Atle-Tiba - Portuguese

Brazilian football derbies
Coritiba Foot Ball Club